Robert Tobin may refer to:

Robert "Bob" Deam Tobin (1961–2022), American academic
Robert "Rob" John Tobin (born 1983), British athlete